Steve Hobbs is a farmer and a Missouri Republican politician.

Politics
Hobbs was first elected to the Missouri House of Representatives in 2002, winning reelection in 2004.

Personal information
He is the president of Hobbs Farms, Inc., a firm he had started with his father, in 1997. He is a member of such organizations as the Missouri Farm Bureau, for which he is former secretary/treasurer and legislative chair, the Beef Advisory Board, of which he is a former president and chair, the Mexico MFA Exchange Board, the Audrian County Cattleman's Board, of which he is a past president, a board member of Mexico MFA Oil,  the Missouri Beef Industry Council, and the Soybean Association. He is currently a resident of Mexico, Missouri and is a member of Rush Hill Community Church.

References

Official Manual, State of Missouri, 2005–2006. Jefferson City, MO: Secretary of State.

Year of birth missing (living people)
Living people
Republican Party members of the Missouri House of Representatives
People from Mexico, Missouri